Dörgicse is a village in Veszprém county, Hungary.

It consists of three hamlets (Felsõdörgicse, Alsódörgicse and Kisdörgicse) built on separate hills 4.3 km (2.7 m) north of Lake Balaton. Dörgicse is famous for the wine production and its three medieval churches  which were devastated during the Turkish wars in the 16th and 17th centuries.

Gallery

References

External links 

 Street map (Hungarian)

Populated places in Veszprém County